Like all municipalities of Puerto Rico, Florida is subdivided into administrative units called barrios, which are roughly comparable to minor civil divisions, (and means wards or boroughs or neighborhoods in English). The barrios and subbarrios, in turn, are further subdivided into smaller local populated place areas/units called sectores (sectors in English). The types of sectores may vary, from normally sector to urbanización to reparto to barriada to residencial, among others.

A newer municipality of Puerto Rico, Florida has one barrio called Florida Adentro and two subbarrios: Florida Zona Urbana and Pajonal, and it does not have a barrio-pueblo like most of the other municipalities of Puerto Rico.

The following areas are neighborhoods in Florida:

 Parcelas Arroyo
 Parcelas Selgas
 Perol
 Pueblo Viejo
 San Agustín
 Tosas

List of sectors by barrio

Florida Adentro

 Alturas de Yanes 2da.
 Alturas de Yanes 3ra.
 Florida Gardens Apartments
 Avenida Heriberto González (Carretera 6642)
 Calle Antonio Alcázar
 Calle Charlie Montoyo
 Calle Delicias
 Calle Julio Reina (formerly Extensión Calle Jazmín)
 Calle Manuel Colón
 Calle Roberto González
 Calle Valle Verde
 Carretera 140
 Comunidad Alturas de Pajonal
 Comunidad Arroyo
 Comunidad La Fuente
 Edificio Mieses
 Égida de Florida
 Extensión Selgas (Los Quemaos)
 Parcelas Alturas de Yanes 1ra.
 Parcelas Selgas I
 Parcelas Selgas II
 Reparto Ceiba
 Reparto Diana
 Reparto Martínez
 Reparto Rita Mar
 Reparto San Agustín
 Residencial Villas de Florida
 Residencial Florida Housing
 Sector Aguacate
 Sector Ceiba
 Sector Comisión
 Sector Dorta
 Sector El Hoyo
 Sector Fogones
 Sector Juana Gómez
 Sector La Maldonado
 Sector La Vázquez
 Sector La Villamil
 Sector Los Guanos
 Sector Los Mangoses
 Sector Pajonal
 Sector Perol
 Sector Pueblo Viejo
 Sector Pueblo
 Sector Puerto Blanco
 Sector Riachuelo
 Sector San Agustín
 Sector San José
 Sector San Luis
 Sector Tosas
 Sector Valle Encantado
 Urbanización Altos de Florida
 Urbanización Altos de Florida II
 Urbanización Alturas de Florida
 Urbanización Colinas de Lourdes
 Urbanización Country Hills
 Urbanización Estancias de Arroyo
 Urbanización Estancias de Florida
 Urbanización Estancias de la Ceiba
 Urbanización Estancias de Lourdes
 Urbanización Haciendas Florida
 Urbanización Jardines de Florida
 Urbanización Las Flores
 Urbanización San José
 Urbanización Seoane
 Urbanización Vegas de Florida

See also

 List of communities in Puerto Rico

References

Florida
Florida